Ann Margaret McGrath  is the WK Hancock Chair of History at the Australian National University in Canberra. She is Director of the Research Centre for Deep History and Kathleen Fitzpatrick ARC Laureate Fellow 2017–22.

In 1994, she was awarded the Human Rights Non-Fiction Award for Creating a Nation jointly with co-authors Patricia Grimshaw, Marilyn Lake and Marian Quartly.

McGrath was elected Fellow of the Academy of the Social Sciences in Australia in 2004. She was awarded the Medal of the Order of Australia in 2007 and appointed a Member of the Order of Australia in 2017 for "significant service to the social sciences as an academic and researcher in the field of Indigenous history, and to tertiary education". She was awarded the Kathleen Fitzpatrick Australian Laureate Fellowship for her project on the history of Australia, combining Indigenous stories with scientific data in 2017. Also in 2017, she was elected Fellow of the Australian Academy of the Humanities.

In 2016 her book, Illicit Love, won the General History Prize at the New South Wales Premier's History Awards. It was shortlisted for the 2016 ACT Book of the Year.

Selected works 

 
 
  (Reissued in 2020.)

References

External links 
 

Living people
Year of birth missing (living people)
University of Queensland alumni
La Trobe University alumni
Academic staff of the Australian National University
Recipients of the Medal of the Order of Australia
Members of the Order of Australia
Fellows of the Academy of the Social Sciences in Australia
Fellows of the Australian Academy of the Humanities
Australian women historians